Algerian nationalism is pride in the Algerian identity and culture. It has been historically infuenced by  the conflicts between the Deylik of Algiers and European countries, the French conquest of Algeria and the subsequent French colonial rule in Algeria, the Algerian War, and since independence by socialist and Islamic ideologies, Berberism and Arab nationalism.

Early manifestations

Formation of the Algerian identity 
It is hard to designate when Algerian identity formed. Medieval islamic chroniclers divided the Maghreb region into three distinctive geographical and cultural regions before the Regency of Algiers (Dawla al-Jaza'ir) was established.

 Maghreb al-Aqsa (Western Maghreb, approximately modern Morocco)
 Maghreb al-Awsat (Central Maghreb, approximately modern Algeria)
 Maghreb al-Adna (Eastern Maghreb, Ifriqiya, or modern day Tunisia and Tripolitania)

The exact borders of these regions were flexible and were not fixed at that time. After the collapse of the Almohad Caliphate the empire was divided by 3 dynasties: The Merinids in al-Aqsa (Morocco, with the exception of the Moulouya region), the Zayyanids in al-Awsat (between the Moulouya River and western Kabylia), and finally the Hafsids in Ifriqiya (from Béjaïa to Tripoli), but there existed dynasties controlling these regions previously, and the borders were constantly changing between these 3 rival dynasties.

The area of the Central Maghreb (Maghreb al-Awsat) or what could be seen as the predecessor of Algeria were defined as being between the Moulouya River in the west, and Annaba in the east by most medieval chroniclers such as Ibn Khaldun, although this wasn't always the case and some defined different borders for it.

Regency of Algiers (1515-1830) 
The transition from "Central Maghrebi" to the "Algerian" identity started in the early 16th century, with the establishment of the Regency of Algiers ("Dawlat Al-Jaza'ir", or "State of Algeria" in Arabic). Several patriotic works such as the Sirat al-Mujahid Khayr al-Din were created in this era, and it is in this era that Algerian identity and patriotism really took shape. The state of Algiers, while initially independent, came under Ottoman rule in 1520, and gained significant autonomy over the years until it became de fact independent in 1710. In this era Algerian patriotism at this time was mainly influenced by conflicts with the neighbouring Morocco and Tunisia, and conflicts with European states, mainly Spain and France, with sayings such as "Algiers is protected by Allah" becoming extremely popular after the failed Algiers expedition in 1541. Generally, the Algerian authorities classified people into 5 main groups:

 Moors (ساراكينوس, or "Sarākīnūs"). Referring to the urban population often descended or mixed with Moorish refugees from Al-Andalus.
 Bedouins (بدوي, or "Badawī"). Referring to the various Arab or Arabized Berber nomadic tribes of Algeria.
 Kabyles (القبايل, or "al-Qabāyel"). Referring to all Berber peoples of the region meaning "the tribes". 
 Turks (الأتراك, or "Al-Atrāk"). A general classification from all people from the Ottoman Empire, including Turkish, Albanian, Greek people.
 Jews (اليهود, or "Yahūd"). Referring to the mainly Sephardi and Mizrahi jews of Algeria.

The earliest surviving nationalistic Algerian work was written by Hamdan ben Othman Khodja, an ex-diplomat of the Regency, 3 years after its collapse in 1833. Ideological disagreements still existed at this era. Many local leaders wished to see the Regency of Algiers go and instead a completely independent Algerian state be established, such as Muhieddiene al-Hassani and his son Abdelkader ibn Muhieddine, and there had been tensions in the country regarding modernization. The Regency of Algiers collapsed in 1830, after the Invasion of Algiers by France.

Emirate of Abdelkader 
2 years after the beginning of the French conquest of Algeria, in 1832 local tribes around Mascara, a region which was still independent from the French and in need of a leader after the collapse of the administration of the province of Oran, a governorate of the Regecncy, declared loyalty to Emir Abdelkader ibn Muhieddiene, who in turn declared a Jihad for the liberation of Algeria. Abdelkader fought against the French for 15 years until 1847, and comandeered a coalition composed of  Arab, Kabyle, Chenoua, Chaoui and Rifian tribes with him as the Emir, or Sultan. He wished to establish a modern fully independent nation state in Algeria, and established a modern army, invested into education and the economy of his nation. His emirate stretch from the modern Moroccan-Algerian border in the west to the region of Kabylia and M'Sila in the east. The only region not under the control of Abdelkader was the Constantinois which was controlled by Ahmed Bey ben Mohamed Chérif (who fought a Jihad to restore the Regency of Algiers against the French), before it was taken by the French in 1837.

Early 1900s 

 A new generation of Muslims emerged in Algeria at the time of World War I and grew to maturity during the 1920s and 1930s. It consisted of a small but influential class of évolués, other Algerians whose perception of themselves and their country had been shaped by wartime experiences, and a body of religious reformers and teachers. Some of these people were members of the few wealthy Muslim families that had managed to insinuate themselves into the colonial system in the 1890s and had with difficulty succeeded in obtaining for their sons the French education coveted by progressive Algerians. Others were among the about 173,000 Algerians who had served in the French army during World War I or the several hundred thousand more who had assisted the French war effort by working in factories. Many Algerians stayed in France after 1918, and sent the money they earned there to their relatives in Algeria. In France they became aware of a standard of living higher than any they had known at home and of democratic political concepts, taken for granted by Frenchmen in France, which colons, soldiers, and bureaucrats had refused to apply to the Muslim majority in Algeria. Some Algerians also became acquainted with the pan-Arab nationalism growing in the Middle East.

Political movements

One of the earliest movements for political reform was an integrationist group, the Young Algerians (Jeunese Algérienne). Its members were drawn from the small, liberal elite of well-educated, middle-class évolués who demanded an opportunity to prove that they were French as well as Muslim. In 1908 they delivered to France's Prime Minister Georges Clemenceau a petition that expressed opposition under the status quo to a proposed policy to conscript Muslim Algerians into the French army. If, however, the state granted the Muslims full citizenship, the petition went on, opposition to conscription would be dropped. In 1911, in addition to demanding preferential treatment for "the intellectual elements of the country", the group called for an end to unequal taxation, broadening of the franchise, more schools, and protection of indigenous property. The Young Algerians added a significant voice to the reformist movement against French colonial policy that began in 1892 and continued until the outbreak of World War I. In part to reward Muslims who fought and died for France, Clemenceau appointed reform-minded Charles Jonnart as governor general. Reforms promulgated in 1919 and known as the Jonnart Law expanded the number of Muslims permitted to vote to about 425,000. The legislation also removed all voters from the jurisdiction of the humiliating Code de l'indigénat.

The most popular Muslim leader in Algeria after the war was Khalid ibn Hashim, grandson of Abd al Qadir and a member of the Young Algerians, although he differed with some members of the group over acceptance of the Jonnart Law. Some Young Algerians were willing to work within the framework set out by the reforms, but Emir Khalid, as he was known, continued to press for the complete Young Algerian program. He was able to win electoral victories in Algiers and to enliven political discourse with his calls for reform and full assimilation, but by 1923 he tired of the struggle and left Algeria, eventually retiring to Damascus.

Some of the Young Algerians in 1926 formed the Federation of Elected Natives (Fédération des Élus Indigènes, FEI), as many of the former group's members had joined the circle of Muslims eligible to hold public office. The federation's objectives were the assimilation of the évolués into the French community, with full citizenship but without surrendering their personal status as Muslims, and the eventual integration of Algeria as a full province of France. Other objectives included equal pay for equal work for government employees, abolition of travel restrictions to and from France, abolition of the Code de l'indigénat (which had been reinstituted earlier), and electoral reform.

The first group to call for Algerian independence was the Star of North Africa (Étoile Nord-Africain, known as Star). The group was originally a solidarity group formed in 1926 in Paris to coordinate political activity among North African workers in France and to defend "the material, moral, and social interests of North African Muslims". The leaders included members of the French Communist Party and its labor confederation, and in the early years of the struggle for independence the party provided material and moral support. Ahmed Messali Hadj, the Star's secretary general, enunciated the groups demands in 1927. In addition to independence from France, the Star called for freedom of press and association, a parliament chosen through universal suffrage, confiscation of large estates, and the institution of Arabic schools. The Star was first banned in 1929 and operated underground until 1933 when reconstituted with Messali Hadj President, Imache Amar General Secretary and Belkacem Radjef Treasurer. Its newspaper, El Ouma, reached a circulation of 43,500. Influenced by the Arab nationalist ideas of Lebanese Druze Shakib Arslan, Messali turned away from communist support to a more nationalist outlook, for which the French Communist Party attacked the Star. He returned to Algeria to organize urban workers and peasant farmers and in 1937 founded the Algerian People's Party (Parti du Peuple Algérien, PPA) to mobilize the Algerian working class at home and in France to improve its situation through political action. For Messali Hadj, who ruled the PPA with an iron hand, these aims were inseparable from the struggle for an independent Algeria in which socialist and Islamic values would be fused.

Foreign inspiration

Algeria's Islamic reform movement took inspiration from Egyptian reformers Muhammad Abduh and Muhammad Rashid Rida and stressed the Arab and Islamic roots of the country. Starting in the 1920s, the reform ulema, religious scholars, promoted a purification of Islam in Algeria and a return to the Qur'an and the sunna, or tradition of the Prophet. The reformers favored the adoption of modern methods of inquiry and rejected the superstitions and folk practices of the countryside, actions that brought them into confrontation with the marabouts. The reformers published their own periodicals and books, and established free modern Islamic schools that stressed Arabic language and culture as an alternative to the schools for Muslims operated for many years by the French. Under the dynamic leadership of Shaykh Abd al Hamid Ben Badis, the reformist ulama organized the Association of Algerian Muslim Ulema (Association des Uléma Musulmans Algériens, AUMA) in 1931. Although their support was concentrated in the Constantine area, the AUMA struck a responsive chord among the Muslim masses, with whom it had closer ties than did the other nationalist organizations. As the Islamic reformers gained popularity and influence, the colonial authorities responded in 1933 by refusing them permission to preach in official mosques. This move and similar ones sparked several years of sporadic religious unrest.

European influences had some impact on indigenous Muslim political movements because Ferhat Abbas and Messali Hadj even with opposite views, essentially looked to France for their more secular ideological models. Ben Badis, however, believed that "Islam is our religion, Arabic our language, Algeria our fatherland." Abbas went as far as summing up the philosophy of the liberal integrationists to oppose the claims of the nationalists by denying in 1936 that Algeria had a separate identity. However, Ben Badis responded that he, too, had looked to the past and found "that this Algerian nation is not France, cannot be France, and does not want to be France … [but] has its culture, its traditions and its characteristics, good or bad, like every other nation of the earth." He was opposed to French colonial rule.

The colons, for their part, rejected any movement toward reform, whether instigated by integrationist or nationalist organizations. Reaction in Paris to the nationalists was divided. In the 1930s, French liberals saw only the évolués as a possible channel for diffusing political power in Algeria, denigrating Messali Hadj for demagoguery and the AUMA for religious obscurantism. At all times, however, the French government was confronted by the monolithic intransigence of the leaders of the European community in Algeria in opposing any devolution of power to Muslims, even to basically pro-French évolués. The colons also had powerful allies in the French National Assembly, the bureaucracy, the armed forces, and the business community, and were strengthened in their resistance by their almost total control of the Algerian administration and police.

From 1954 to 1962, Algerian nationalists found significant support in Germany, which had a deciding impact on French counterinsurgency efforts during the Algerian war. In that regard, the activities of the FLN outside of France and Algeria was examined. The role of anti-colonial movements underscores the problematic interactions between different security and intelligence services during the Cold War.

Viollette Plan

The mounting social, political, and economic crises in Algeria for the first time induced older and newly emerged classes of indigenous society to engage from 1933 to 1936 in numerous acts of political protest. The government responded with more restrictive laws governing public order and security. In 1936, French socialist Léon Blum became premier in a Popular Front government and appointed Maurice Viollette his minister of state. The Ulemas and in June 1936 the Star of Messali, sensing a new attitude in Paris that would favor their agenda, cautiously joined forces with the FEI.

Representatives of these groups and members of the Algerian Communist Party (Parti Communiste Algérien, PCA) met in Algiers in 1936 at the first Algerian Muslim Congress. The congress drew up an extensive Charter of Demands, which called for the abolition of laws permitting imposition of the régime d'exception, political integration of Algeria and France, maintenance of personal legal status by Muslims acquiring French citizenship, fusion of European and Muslim education systems in Algeria, freedom to use Arabic in education and the press, equal wages for equal work, land reform, establishment of a single electoral college, and universal suffrage.

Blum and Viollette gave a warm reception to a congress delegation in Paris and indicated that many of their demands could be met. Meanwhile, Viollette drew up for the Blum government a proposal to extend French citizenship with full political equality to certain classes of the Muslim "elite", including university graduates, elected officials, army officers, and professionals. Messali Hadj saw in the Viollette Plan a new "instrument of colonialism … to split the Algerian people by separating the elite from the masses". The components of the congress—the ulema, the FEI, and communists—were heartened by the proposal and gave it varying measures of support. Mohamed Bendjelloul and Abbas, as spokesmen for the évolués, who would have the most to gain from the measure, considered this plan a major step toward achieving their aims and redoubled their efforts through the liberal FEI to gain broad support for the policy of Algerian integration with France. Not unexpectedly, however, the colons had taken uncompromising exception to the Blum-Viollette proposal. Although the project would have granted immediate French citizenship and voting rights to only about 21,000 Muslims, with provision for adding a few thousand more each year, spokesmen for the colons raised the specter of the European electorate's being submerged by a Muslim majority. Colon administrators and their supporters threw procedural obstacles in the path of the legislation, and the government gave it only lukewarm support, resulting in its ultimate failure.

While the Viollette Plan was still a live issue, however, Messali Hadj made a dramatic comeback to Algeria and had significant local success in attracting people to the Star. A mark of his success was the fact that in 1937 the government dissolved the Star. The same year Messali Hadj formed the PPA, which had a more moderate program, but he and other PPA leaders were arrested following a large demonstration in Algiers. Although Messali Hadj spent many years in jail, his party had the most widespread support of all opposition groups until it was banned in 1939.

Disillusioned by the failure of the Viollette Plan to win acceptance in Paris, Abbas shifted from a position of favoring assimilation of the évolués and full integration with France to calling for the development of a Muslim Algeria in close association with France but retaining "her own physiognomy, her language, her customs, her traditions". His more immediate goal was greater political, social, and economic equality for Muslims with the colons. By 1938 the cooperation among the parties that made up the congress began to break up.

Polarization and politicization at the time of WWII

Algerian Muslims rallied to the French side at the start of World War II as they had done in World War I. Nazi Germany's quick defeat of France, however, and the establishment of the collaborationist Vichy regime, to which the colons were generally sympathetic, not only increased the difficulties of the Muslims but also posed an ominous threat to the Jews in Algeria. The Algerian administration vigorously enforced the anti-Semitic laws imposed by Vichy, which stripped Algerian Jews of their French citizenship. Potential opposition leaders in both the European and the Muslim communities were arrested.

Allied landings were made at Algiers and Oran by 70,000 British and United States troops on November 8, 1942, in coordination with landings in Morocco. As part of Operation Torch under the overall command of General Dwight D. Eisenhower, Algiers and Oran were secured two days later after a determined resistance by French defenders. On November 11, Admiral François Darlan, commander in chief of Vichy French forces, ordered a ceasefire in North Africa. Algeria provided a base for the subsequent Allied campaign in Tunisia.

After the fall of the Vichy regime in Algeria, General Henri Giraud, Free French commander in chief in North Africa, slowly rescinded repressive Vichy laws despite opposition by colon extremists. He also called on the Muslim population to supply troops for the Allied war effort. Ferhat Abbas and twenty-four other Muslim leaders replied that Algerians were ready to fight with the Allies in freeing their homeland but demanded the right to call a conference of Muslim representatives to develop political, economic, and social institutions for the indigenous population "within an essentially French framework".  Giraud, who succeeded in raising an army of 250,000 men to fight in the Italian campaign, refused to consider this proposal, explaining that "politics" must wait until the end of the war.

The first large Algerian nationalist protest took place in 1945.

The manifesto of the Algerian People

In March 1943, Abbas, who had abandoned assimilation as a viable alternative to self-determination, presented the French administration with the Manifesto of the Algerian People, signed by fifty-six Algerian nationalist and international leaders. Outlining the perceived past and present problems of colonial rule, the manifesto demanded specifically an Algerian constitution that would guarantee immediate and effective political participation and legal equality for Muslims.  It called for agrarian reform, recognition of Arabic as an official language on equal terms with French, recognition of a full range of civil liberties, and the freeing of political prisoners of all parties.

The French governor general created a commission composed of prominent Muslims and Europeans to study the manifesto. This commission produced a supplementary reform program, which was forwarded to General Charles de Gaulle, leader of the Free French movement. De Gaulle and his newly appointed governor general in Algeria, General Georges Catroux, a recognized liberal, viewed the manifesto as evidence of a need to develop a mutually advantageous relationship between the European and Muslim communities. Catroux was reportedly shocked by the "blinded spirit of social conservatism" of the colons, but he did not regard the manifesto as a satisfactory basis for cooperation because he felt it would submerge the European minority in a Muslim state. Instead, the French administration in 1944 instituted a reform package, based on the 1936 Viollette Plan, that granted full French citizenship to certain categories of "meritorious" Algerian Muslims—military officers and decorated veterans, university graduates, government officials, and members of the Legion of Honor—who numbered about 60,000.

Demanding autonomy from France

A new factor influencing Muslim reaction to the reintroduction of the Viollette Plan — which by that date even many moderates had rejected as inadequate — was the shift in Abbas's position from support for integration to the demand for an autonomous state federated with France. Abbas gained the support of the AUMA and formed Friends of the Manifesto and Liberty (Amis du Manifeste et de la Liberté, AML) to work for Algerian autonomie with equal rights for both Europeans and Muslims. Within a short time, the AML's newspaper, Égalité, claimed 500,000 subscribers, indicating unprecedented interest in independence. By this time, over 350,000 Algerian Muslims (out of a total Algerian Muslim population of nine million) were working in France to support their relatives in Algeria, and many thousands more worked in towns. Messali and his PPA still rejected anything short of independence.

Social unrest grew in the winter of 1944–45, fueled in part by a poor wheat harvest, shortages of manufactured goods, and severe unemployment. On May Day, the clandestine PPA organized demonstrations in twenty-one towns across the country, with marchers demanding freedom for Messali Hadj and independence for Algeria. Violence erupted in some locations, including Algiers and Oran, leaving many wounded and three dead.

Nationalist leaders were resolving to mark the approaching liberation of Europe with demonstrations calling for their own liberation, and it was clear that a clash with the authorities was imminent. The tensions between the Muslim and colon communities exploded on May 8, 1945, V-E Day, in an outburst of such violence as to make their polarization complete, if not irreparable. Police had told local organizers they could march in Sétif only if they did not display nationalist flags or placards. They ignored the warnings, the march began, and gunfire resulted in which a number of police and demonstrators were killed. Marchers rampaged, leading to the killing of 103 Europeans. Word spread to the countryside, and villagers attacked colon settlements and government buildings.

The army and police responded by conducting a prolonged and systematic ratissage (literally, raking over) of suspected centers of dissidence. In addition, military airplanes and ships attacked Muslim population centers. According to official French figures, 1,500 Muslims died as a result of these countermeasures. Other estimates vary from 6,000 to as high as 45,000 killed.

In the aftermath of the Sétif violence, the AML was outlawed, and 5,460 Muslims, including Abbas and many PPA members, were arrested. Abbas deplored the uprising but charged that its repression had taken Algeria "back to the days of the Crusades". In April 1946, Abbas once again asserted the demands of the manifesto and founded the Democratic Union of the Algerian Manifesto (Union Démocratique du Manifeste Algérien), UDMA Abbas called for a free, secular, and republican Algeria loosely federated with France. Upon his release from five-year house arrest, Messali Hadj returned to Algeria and formed the Movement for the Triumph of Democratic Liberties (Mouvement pour le Triomphe des Libertés Démocratiques, MTLD), which quickly drew supporters from a broad cross-section of society. Committed to unequivocal independence, the MTLD firmly opposed Abbas's proposal for federation. However some ex-PPA members convinced that independence could only be obtained by military means, continued to operate clandestinely and maintain cells in the Aures Mountains and Kabylie while maintaining membership in the MTLD. In 1947, they formed the (Organisation spéciale, OS) operating loosely within the MTLD and led by Hocine Ait Ahmed. Their goal was to conduct terrorist operations since political protest through legal channels had been suppressed by the colonial authorities. Ait Ahmed was later succeeded as chief of the OS by Ahmed Ben Bella, one of the early Algerian nationalist leaders.

The National Assembly approved the government-proposed Organic Statute of Algeria in August 1947. This law called for the creation of an Algerian Assembly with one house representing Europeans and "meritorious" Muslims, and the other representing the remaining more than 8 million Muslims. The statute also replaced mixed communes with elected local councils, abolished military government in the Algerian Sahara, recognized Arabic as an official language with French, and proposed enfranchising Muslim women. Muslim and colon deputies alike abstained or voted against the statute but for diametrically opposed reasons: the Muslims because it fell short of their expectations and the colons because it went too far.

The sweeping victory of Messali Hadj's MTLD in the 1947 municipal elections frightened the colons, whose political leaders, through fraud and intimidation, attempted to obtain a result more favorable to them in the following year's first Algerian Assembly voting. The term élection algérienne became a synonym for rigged election. The MTLD was allowed nine seats, Abbas's UDMA was given eight, and government-approved "independents" were awarded fifty-five seats. These results may have reassured some of the colons that the nationalists had been rejected by the Muslim community, but the elections suggested to many Muslims that a peaceful solution to Algeria's problems was not possible.

At the first session of the colon-controlled Algerian Assembly, an MTLD delegate was arrested at the door, prompting other Muslim representatives to walk out in protest. A request by Abbas to gain the floor was refused. Frustrated by these events, the nationalist parties, joined by the PCA, formed a common political front that undertook to have the results of the election voided. French socialists and moderates tried to initiate a formal inquiry into the reports of vote fraud but were prevented from doing so by the assembly's European delegates, who persuaded the governor general that an investigation would disturb the peace. New elections in 1951 were subject to the same sort of rigging that had characterized the 1948 voting.

In 1952 anti-French demonstrations precipitated by the OS led to Messali Hadj's arrest and deportation to France. Internal divisions and attacks by the authorities severely weakened the MTLD, draining its energies. Colon extremists took every opportunity to persuade the French government of the need for draconian measures against the emergent independence movement.

Ben Bella created a new underground action committee to replace the OS, which had been broken up by the French police in 1950. The new group, the Revolutionary Committee of Unity and Action (Comité Révolutionnaire d'Unité et d'Action, CRUA), was based in Cairo, where Ben Bella had fled in 1952. Known as the chefs historiques (historical chiefs), the group's nine original leaders—Hocine Ait Ahmed, Mohamed Boudiaf, Belkacem Krim, Rabah Bitat, Larbi Ben M'Hidi, Mourad Didouch, Moustafa Ben Boulaid, Mohamed Khider, and Ben Bella—were considered the leaders of the Algerian War of Independence.

Algerian nationalism and the war of independence

Political mobilisation

Between March and October 1954, the CRUA organised a military network in Algeria comprising six military regions (referred to at the time as wilayat; singular: wilaya). The leaders of these regions and their followers became known as the "internals". Ben Bella, Mohammed Khider, and Hocine Aït Ahmed formed the External Delegation in Cairo. Encouraged by i.e. Egypt's President Gamal Abdul Nasser (r. 1954–71), their role was to gain foreign support for the rebellion and to acquire arms, supplies, and funds for the wilaya commanders. In October the CRUA renamed itself the National Liberation Front (Front de Libération Nationale, FLN), which assumed responsibility for the political direction of the revolution. The National Liberation Army (Armée de Libération Nationale, ALN), the FLN's military arm, was to conduct the War of Independence within Algeria. FLN and ALN diffused the civil-military relations, and the army remained present throughout the end of the war and beyond, although in the end the victory would in the end be a political one rather than a military. The FLN resorted to populist rhetorics and used symbolic slogans such as for example “one sole hero: the people”, however, they remained somewhat distanced from the population during the war. This was partly a consequence of the inability of a class strong enough to emerge and articulate a credible and overarching consensus about revolutionary resistance strategies under the oppression of the colonial system. The FLN was a complex organisation, entailing much more than what perceived at first glance, they were characterised by an anti-intellectualism and a conviction that the country (and thereby also the abstract masses) had to be liberated by a violent group of dedicated revolutionaries. Simultaneously, their leadership struggled with intra-elite ideological conflicts and throughout history, FLN has simultaneously contained Liberals, Marxists as well as Islamists.

Defining the nation

The many and versatile events of the war of liberation in Algeria (see Algerian war) between 1954 - 1962, one of the longest and bloodiest decolonisation struggles, have in different ways shaped past and present ideas about the Algerian nation. Both warring parties resorted extensively to violence, and the collective memory of torture during the Algerian war of Independence still lingers heavily on the national identity of Algeria.

The FLN was after some time more or less the predominant organisation in the national struggle against France, however support of the national liberation rested partly on a cornerstone of intimidation, aimed at promoting compliance from the native population. To be seen as a pro-French Muslim - a “béni-oui-oui” could cause immediate retribution. Spurred by i.e. internal political turmoil partly caused by an enormous presence of the French army, an effect of a vote in of special powers by the National Assembly, FLN was under severe pressure in the late 50s. The nation was torn between an extremely aggressive coloniser and an FLN who claimed to embody the struggle of the people.

The dissonant role of the Woman in Algerian nationalism

Women played a major yet diverse role in the war of independence in Algeria (see  Women in the Algerian War), as physical participants but also as symbolic contestation. The war could in one way be seen as a battle to win hearts and minds of the people, and the body and idea of the Muslim woman was an arena of major confrontation between the French and the FLN. On the one hand, French rule was justified (as in many other conflicts and contexts) by pointing to the Islamic family regulations as problematic and backwards and something that needed to be corrected and governed, an issue that only the “emancipatory power of French values” could solve. Moreover, it was thought that appealing to the Muslim woman was the only way to “win the hearts and minds of the family as a whole”. As a response, the (often rural) Veiled Muslim Woman became a symbol of Algerian resistance, an allegory of purity and the impenetrability of Religion.

However, the FLN's nationalistic discourse on women was constructed in a similar fashion to the French one, and was to some extent maybe directed to an international audience rather than the (rural) females who were subjects of the propaganda. They made sure to diffuse images of women who were bearing weapons and who were participating in the war, and argued that only emancipation from colonial rule would lead to this absolute liberation of women. Abbas once said, inspired by the works of Fanon, that “Women are the symbol of the new society and shall part-take in shaping new societies.”. This image of the liberated Algerian Woman counteracted racial stereotypes and made it harder for France to justify continued coloniality.

On 30 September 1956, three female FLN members, Zora Drif, Djamila Bouhired and Samia Lakhdari placed bombs in two cafés in the French settler neighbourhoods as a response to an earlier bomb placed by units of the French police in a Muslim quarter. They had managed to trespass the French checkpoint by simulating “french appearance” - later it has however been noted that many women who were part of the urban FLN bomb networks were often students who already dressed in a western fashion, what was disguised was thereby their political engagement rather than their physical identity. The event is said to have sparked the Battle of Algiers (1956–57) significantly. Djamila and the political engagement of women in the independence war was depicted in the Egyptian film Jamila, the Algerian (1958)- a movie that managed to mobilise huge support for the Algerian resistance movement throughout the Arab world. Later the trio also played an important part in The Battle of Algiers produced in 1966. Popular culture enforced the idealised image of the emancipated Algerian mujahadinat. These three women, together with for example the three Djamilas (Djamila Bouhired(again), Djamila Bouazza and Djamila Boupacha) became important figures to resort to in the construction of the Algerian self.

The treatment and torture of these women and other prisoners taken during the battle of Algiers also played great role in damaging French legitimacy as a moral authority. Simultaneously, the (partly self-chosen) de-politisation of their own actions contributed to a scattered gender order.

FLN as the symbol of national liberation

The Battle of Algiers (1956-57) was a phase of the war that could be described as militarily won by the French but politically won by FLN. The French strategy, led by Charles de Gaulle and General Maurice Challe, alienated the population and resulted in international condemnation of the brutality of the French method. The first time Algerians’ right to self-determination was recognised was in a speech by de Gaule on 16 September 1959. Whereas French policies changed over time, and in addition was highly fragmented due to the ideological fractions between the settler population, the mainland French government and the OAS (Organisation armée secrète), the outspoken political objective of FLN remained national independence. This allowed them some extent to create an image of unity and common purpose, somehow managing to embody the voice of the people in their official discourse. Even though they failed to articulate broad-based national goals and strategies to achieve them, they remained a symbol of national liberation, something that until this day might be what has contributed largely to their legitimacy.

Evolution of Algerian nationalism after independence
In 1963, the Nationality law defined Algerianness on the basis of ethno-cultural terms, which meant that on paper, someone's participation in the war of independence was the signifier of their nationality. This meant amongst many things that even Europeans who had fought on the Algerian side in the war could earn the right to become Algerians.

Algeria – Mecca of the revolutionaries
In 1962, Ben Bella was after a turbulent couple of months named president of the independent Algeria, and drawing upon a largely mythical and invented past tried to ambitiously govern the post-colonial reality. The relationship between leaders and ordinary people was under the first years of independence a seemingly egalitarian one, building upon the social levelling present in Algerian nationalism even since Messali Hadj. Ben Bella contributed to the mapping of Algeria as a model country in the fight against colonial and imperial rule, and the portrayal of Algeria as a new form of socialist society. Shortly after independence, Algeria's borders were opened up to “brothers of arms” from contemporary liberation movements in i.e. Namibia, Rhodesia, Brittany, Congo and Mozambique. Most prominent maybe the refuge offered to Nelson Mandela and the ANC movement in South Africa. His travels to Cuba, where he met with both Fidel Castro and Che Guevara to discuss the communist revolutions further amplified the socialist affiliation of the government were important signifiers of the nature of the Algerian self. The inspiration as well as support that was offered by multiple Eastern European countries as well as diplomatic relations with Russia, China, a number of countries in the North Africa and Middle East and even the USA also emphasised that Algeria was no longer going to be dependent on one single imperial State. Algeria and more specifically Algiers become the incarnation of pan-arabism and pan-Africanism, a central point - and was transformed into a “”Mecca of the revolutionaries”.

The epitome of the socialist and revolutionary Algerian nation-building project was the PANAF (Festival panafricain d'Alger), the first pan-African cultural festival of enormous size, that took place in 1969. Under the leadership of Boumediene, the city continued to play its role of a capital of liberation movements, although denunciation of the anti-Islamic “communist influences” Ben Bella was accused of having susceptible to. The festival was an important event in the continued construction of the national identity and partly contributed to restore some of its appeal to the youths of Algeria.The festival took the shape of a huge two-day carnival where performances, expositions as well as intellectual conferences merged. It hosted important figures from the entire African continent as well as from the African diaspora, such as Miriam Makeba, Archie Shepp, Nina Simone, Maya Angelou, members from the Black Panthers, and members from Patrice Lumumba’s Congolese independence movement. In many ways, the first PANAF was a subversive and temporary space which had never been seen before and might never occur again. During a grand synopsium, Boumediene addressed three main questions that to a large extent shaped the discourse surrounding the festival and pointed to the role of culture in the construction of national as well as panafricain identities. Firstly the reality of the African culture, secondly the role African culture in national liberation struggles and in the consolidation of an African unity, and thirdly the role of African culture in the future social development of Africa. The nationalist project of Boumediène was is a way articulated as a dual one, in the sens that it aimed to go back to traditional values and norms, but at the same time to progress and develop in the modern world of science and technology.

Diverse 1970s and 80s
During the 1970s and 80s, much happened in the Algerian society. Early on, Boumedienne made efforts to strengthen the national image, independence from the outside world was emphasised and oil and gas was nationalised. Even though the idea of a collective independence remained present, multiple identities increasingly competed to patent what it was to be Algerian. The cultural battle between French, Berber and Arabic boomed - and the political elite favoured Arabisation on the expense of for example Berber culture and what could be deemed as western. One of the consequences of arabisation was the introduction of the Algerian Family Code, a law informed by a reading of Islamic law which highly compromised the rights of women. The “liberation” some women had experienced during the war of independence was step by step halted or withdrawn. The mujahadinat past of some women could however still legitimise some activist's campaigns on women's rights issues in the 80s and forward, since their proved belonging to the nation could (at least partly) provide proof that their ideas were not simply a consequence of westernisation.

"Black Decade” and the tearing apart of the collective Algerian self
In the shift from 1980 to 1990 the political culture in Algeria was steaming. Internationally, the communist eastern bloc had just fallen and Islamism was on the rise. Meanwhile, the country was ongoing democratisation and was planning its first multi party election, which the FIS (Islamic Salvation Front) seemed to win. In this context, polarisation bloomed, the political climate toughened and materialised in violence and it got increasingly hard to debate differences verbally. The situation culminated in the Algerian civil war between multiple Islamist groups and the military, who had taken control over the government when the FLN seemed to face defeat. Once again the Algerian society experienced extensive and ruthless violence, which culminated in the late 1990s. In essence, the Algerian entre-soi was torn apart. In 1999 Abdelaziz Bouteflika, a member of the FLN, was elected president and a number of amnesty laws allowed many former Islamists to lay down arms, simultaneously launching extensive counter-terrorist attacks which forced a large number of insurgents out of the country. The violence continued but slowly changed form, and by 2006 the only Islamist splinter group that was still in place, GSPC, joined Al-Qaeda and internationalised their goal. Having before stated that they wanted to "build an Islamic state with sharia law in Algeria", they later proclaimed that they had moved ideologically towards Al-Qaeda's global jihad and aspired to establish an Islamic state in the entire Maghreb.

Young generation and the fall of Bouteflika
The current anti-Bouteflika demonstrations in Algeria (Manifestations de 2019 en Algérie or 2019 Algerian protests) were, especially in the beginning, extremely careful not to be identified with the Islamist civil war of the 1990s or with the Arab spring of early 2010. The protests have been enormous and reoccurred every Friday – but remained peaceful for a long time. Later protests have seen increased presence of the military, which has a long history of intervening in Algerian politics.

Some important symbols stemming from earlier times of Algerian history have however appeared later in the movement. For example, the slogan “one sole hero, the people” is once again visible on the streets. The movement has also referred to the independence in 62 as the "liberation of the state", thus pointing to the current manifestations as a way to obtain "liberation of the people". Moreover, partly as a consequence of one of the earlier Fridays of demonstrations coinciding with the International Women's Day, women very quickly took part in the demonstrations as well.

Algerianism
The term Algerianism has had two meanings in history, one during the French colonial era, and another one after the independence of Algeria.

During the French era, algérianisme was a literary genre with political overtones, born among French Algerian writers (see Algerian literature) who hoped for a common Algerian future culture, uniting French settlers and native Algerians. The term algérianiste was used for the first time in a 1911 novel by Robert Randau, "Les Algérianistes". A Cercle algérianiste was created in France in 1973 by Pieds-Noirs, with several local chapters. It has for "purpose to safeguard the cultural heritage born from the French presence in Algeria."

In Algerian contemporary politics, algerianist is a political label given to Algerian nationalists whose policies focus more on the unity of Algeria's nation-state beyond regional idiosyncrasies.

The modern Arabic language has two distinct words which can be translated into English as "nationalism": qawmiyya قومية, derived from the word qawm (meaning "tribe, ethnic nationality"), and wataniyya وطنية, derived from the word watan (meaning "homeland, native country"). The word qawmiyya has been used to refer to pan-Arab nationalism, while wataniyya has been used to refer to patriotism at a more local level (sometimes disparaged as "regionalism" by those who consider pan-Arabism the only true form of Arab nationalism). Algerianism is the Algerian patriotism, against pan-Arabist nationalism and different forms of regionalisms.

References

Original text: Library of Congress Country Study of Algeria
Encyclopædia Britannica

External links
The Colonial System and Algerian Nationalism

 
Nationalism by country